Masumabad (also Romanized as Ma‘şūmābād; also known as  Shāh ‘Enāyat, Shahīd Sargord Ma‘şūmī, and Shah ‘Ināyat) is a village in Sardshir Rural District, in the Central District of Buin va Miandasht County, Isfahan Province, Iran. At the 2006 census, its population was 526, in 126 families.

References 

Populated places in Buin va Miandasht County